George Town, which encompasses the entirety of Penang Island, is the second largest city in Malaysia and forms the heart of Greater Penang, the country's second most populous metropolitan area. In addition to the city centre's UNESCO World Heritage Site status thanks to its unique architectural and cultural townscape without parallel anywhere in East and Southeast Asia', skyscrapers and high-rises co-exist, sometimes side-by-side, with the heritage buildings.

Due to the shortage of land that is inherent in island cities, high-rise buildings have been springing up all over George Town. It is estimated that, as of 2016, over 680 completed high-rises and skyscrapers currently stand throughout the city.

Penang's first skyscraper remains the tallest within the state to this day. It now houses the offices of the Penang state government, including that of the Chief Minister of Penang.

This is a list of the tallest buildings within George Town which are ranked according to the height and number of floors of each structure.

Tallest buildings

The Council on Tall Buildings and Urban Habitat defines a skyscraper as "a multi-story building whose architectural height is at least ''". The structure's height includes spires and architectural details but does not include its antenna masts.

The following are some of the tallest skyscrapers and high-rises within George Town which are above 150 metres tall and consist of more than 35 storeys.

Structures under construction and proposed
This list is composed of buildings over 100 metres that are under construction within George Town. Proposed structures are also included.

See also
 List of tallest buildings in the world
 List of tallest buildings in Malaysia
 List of tallest buildings in Kuala Lumpur
 List of tallest buildings in Johor Bahru
 List of tallest buildings in Kota Kinabalu

ReferencesGeneral Penang Island skyscrapers - Emporis.com
 Penang Island high-rises - Emporis.comSpecific'''

External links
 Penang skyscrapers on CTBUH

Penang Island

Landmarks in Penang
Tallest in George Town, Penang